Tsutomu Nagata (永田 務, Nagata Tsutomu, born 20 February 1984) is a Japanese Paralympic athlete. He won the bronze medal in the men's marathon T46 event at the 2020 Summer Paralympics held in Tokyo, Japan.

References

Living people
1984 births
Sportspeople from Niigata Prefecture
Paralympic medalists in athletics (track and field)
Athletes (track and field) at the 2020 Summer Paralympics
Medalists at the 2020 Summer Paralympics
Paralympic bronze medalists for Japan
Paralympic athletes of Japan
Japanese male marathon runners
21st-century Japanese people